Anne Richard may refer to:

 Anne C. Richard (born 1960), official in the U.S. State Dept.
 Anne Richard (swimmer) (born 1960), Belgian swimmer

See also
Ann Richards (disambiguation)